HGW may refer to:
 Haigwai language, spoken in Papua New Guinea
 Home gateway, an IP networking device in a residence
 Hyperquenched glassy water
 Hauptmann Gerd Wiesler, a main character in the film The Lives of Others